Trinity School for Ministry (TSM), formerly known as Trinity Episcopal School for Ministry, is an Anglican seminary in Ambridge, Pennsylvania. It is generally associated with low church, evangelical Anglicanism.

History
In the mid 1970s, several prominent evangelical-leaning Episcopal clergy and lay leaders became disillusioned with what they considered the liberal theology and "theological relativism" of the existing Episcopal seminaries. Some members of this group had been involved with the charismatic movement that began in the mid-1960s in some parishes, while others, many associated with the Fellowship of Witness, held to a more traditional Anglican Evangelicalism. These advocates for conservatism in the Episcopal Church of the United States began to meet and plan a new seminary with a curriculum based on orthodox Protestant theology and evangelical principles.

In 1976, Alfred Stanway, a retired Australian missionary bishop to Tanganyika (present-day Tanzania), accepted the call to become the first dean of TSM. Beginning with 17 students and meeting in rented space, Trinity held its first classes in September 1976. Stanway served for two years before retiring.  His successor, John Rodgers, oversaw major growth during his 12-year tenure. In 1989, William C. Frey resigned as Bishop of Colorado to become the third dean and president. In 1996, Peter C. Moore, a founding board member and noted evangelical leader, became the fourth dean and president.  Paul F. M. Zahl was elected Trinity's fifth dean in 2004. He stepped down in May 2007, and Rodgers came out of retirement to serve as Interim Dean and President for one year. English evangelical the Rev. Justyn Terry was named the school's dean in August 2008 and remained in office until returning to his homeland. He now serves as academic dean of Wycliffe Hall, Oxford, England. In May 2016 the Rev. Laurie Thompson was asked to serve as the interim dean. Subsequently, the board invited Thompson to become the seventh dean and president. He was installed on the eve of St. Patrick, March 16, 2017, at St. Stephen's Church in Sewickley. Sarah Lebhar Hall was the preacher on Joshua 1: 1–12.

In 2007, Trinity dropped the word "Episcopal" from its name on some of its publications and printed materials. The school's official name, however, remains unchanged. The modification was made in acknowledgement of the growing number of realigning Anglican bodies sending students to the seminary, including the Anglican Church in North America, the Anglican Mission in the Americas, the Reformed Episcopal Church and the Convocation of Anglicans in North America, the latter two of which are sub-provinces of the ACNA (see Anglican realignment).

Trinity has "board members, faculty, staff, students and alumni on both sides" of movements to realign. Trinity remains, however, an independent institution, neither owned nor controlled by any diocese, parish or province. Trinity disaffiliated with The Episcopal Church in January 2022.

Trinity now serves 150 full-time and part-time students on its campus in Ambridge and 75 more in online degree programs. Many former professors have become bishops in the Episcopal Church or other Anglican bodies around the world.

Evangelical leadership
Founded by leaders of the evangelical wing of the Episcopal Church, TSM has become a central player in the renewal movement in the Episcopal Church. The majority of its over 1,000 graduates who currently serve as clergy and lay leaders are evangelical. Some of the alumni, faculty, and trustees of the school have been among those who support conservative theology within the Episcopal Church, advocating historic views on matters such as the virgin birth, deity of Jesus, and the literal resurrection of Jesus, as well as moral stances such as opposition to abortion and an affirmation of a traditional Christian view of marriage. Some of the graduates of this institution have assumed leadership positions within the Anglican realignment movement, been deposed by the Episcopal Church, and are now members of the Anglican Church in North America.

Although unquestionably evangelical, the seminary includes students, faculty, and staff from among evangelical, charismatic, and Anglo-Catholic wings of Anglicanism, as well as members of other conservative Christian denominations.

Ecumenical relations
Although it is an Anglican seminary, Trinity School for Ministry is home to students from a wide variety of denominations. TSM maintains an M.Div. with a Presbyterian track, with students from the Evangelical Presbyterian Church. The North American Lutheran Seminary of the North American Lutheran Church has also been located at TSM since its founding in 2013.

Academic information
TSM is accredited by the Association of Theological Schools in the United States and Canada and is a charter member of the Evangelical Council for Financial Accountability.

Degree programs
Doctor of Ministry (D.Min.)
Master of Divinity (M.Div.)
Master of Arts in Religion (M.A.R.)
Master of Sacred Theology (S.T.M.)

Diploma and certificate programs
Diploma in Anglican Studies – available on campus or online
Diploma in Christian Ministry – available on campus or online
Certificate in Christian Ministry

Notable alumni

Archbishops
 Benjamin Kwashi (born 1955), GAFCON general secretary and archbishop of Jos in the Church of Nigeria
 Hector "Tito" Zavala (born 1954), presiding bishop of the Anglican Church of South America and the Anglican Church of Chile

Bishops
 David Bryan (born 1957), American bishop suffragan of the Anglican Diocese of the Carolinas
 Alex Farmer (born 1966), American bishop of the Gulf Atlantic Diocese
 Daniel G. P. Gutierrez (born 1964), American bishop of the Episcopal Diocese of Pennsylvania
 Jim Hobby, American bishop of the Anglican Diocese of Pittsburgh
 William H. Ilgenfritz (born 1946), American bishop of the Missionary Diocese of All Saints
 Mark J. Lawrence (born 1950), American bishop of the Episcopal Diocese of South Carolina
 John E. Miller III (born 1949), American bishop in the Anglican Mission in the Americas and the Gulf Atlantic Diocese
 Samson Mwaluda, Tanzanian bishop of the Diocese of Taita–Taveta in the Anglican Church of Tanzania
 Ryan Reed (born 1967), American bishop of the Episcopal Diocese of Fort Worth (ACNA)
 John Rucyahana (born 1945), Rwandan bishop of the Diocese of Shyria in the Anglican Church of Rwanda
 Scott Seely (born 1981), American bishop suffragan in the Anglican Diocese of All Nations
 Jackson Sosthenes, Tanzanian bishop of the Diocese of Dar es Salaam in the Anglican Church of Tanzania
 Jeremiah Taama, Tanzanian bishop of the Diocese of Kajiado in the Anglican Church of Tanzania
 Steven Tighe (born 1956), American bishop of the Anglican Diocese of the Southwest
 Christopher Warner (born 1969), American bishop of the Anglican Diocese of the Mid-Atlantic
 Michael Williams, American bishop suffragan in the Jurisdiction of the Armed Forces and Chaplaincy
 Mark Zimmerman (born 1954), American bishop of the Anglican Diocese of the Southwest

Other
 Ann B. Davis (1926–2014), American actress
 Julia Duin, American journalist

Notable faculty
Gregory Brewer is Bishop of the Episcopal Diocese of Central Florida.
Paul House is associate dean and professor of divinity at Beeson Divinity School of Samford University.
Terence Kelshaw served as Bishop of the Episcopal Diocese of the Rio Grande from 1989 until his retirement in 2005.
William C. Frey, Dean and President, Trinity Episcopal School for Ministry, 1989–1996
Grant LeMarquand was Area Bishop of the Horn of Africa 
David Mills is executive editor of the journal First Things.
John H. Rodgers Jr. was dean and president from 1978 to 1990 and a major participant in the Anglican realignment as a bishop.

References

External links
 Official website

Ambridge, Pennsylvania
Anglican Church in North America
Episcopal Church (United States)
Seminaries and theological colleges in Pennsylvania
Anglican seminaries and theological colleges
Educational institutions established in 1976
Universities and colleges in Beaver County, Pennsylvania
1976 establishments in Pennsylvania